Jon Lundberg (born June 26, 1961 in Royal Oak, Michigan) is an American politician and a Republican member of the Tennessee State Senate for the 4th district. He was first elected to the 105th Tennessee General Assembly (2007–2008). He serves as deputy speaker of the Senate and first vice chairman of the Education Committee, a member of the Finance and Judiciary Committee.  In the House, he was chairman of the Civil Justice Committee, the Commerce Subcommittee, a member of the Civil Justice Subcommittee, a member of the Insurance and Banking Committee, and a member of the Calendar and Rules Committee.  He also served in leadership as the Republican floor leader.

Following the statement from then Lt. Governor Ron Ramsey that he would not seek reelection, Lundberg announced his bid for the Lt. Governor's Senate seat on March 18, 2016.  Lundberg won a four-way primary by more than 55% on August 4, 2016, and went on to win the general election November 8, 2016.

In 2020, Lundberg won re-election to the 4th Senate district in the general election by nearly 80%.

Education and career
Lundberg graduated from the University of Southern Colorado (now known as Colorado State University Pueblo) with a bachelor's degree in communications. He attended graduate school at Wichita State University. He is a retired captain in the United States Navy Reserve, and he served on the board of Highlands Bankshares and Highlands Union Bank and the Tennessee Supreme Court Board of Professional Responsibility. His community service includes membership in the Bristol, Kingsport, and Johnson City Chambers of Commerce, prior service on the board of the Bristol Chamber of Commerce, Bristol Rotary Club, Thomas Green Lecture Series, King College President's Roundtable, past president of the Tri-Cities Chapter of the Public Relations Society of America, and vice president of the Rocky Mount Living History Museum. Jon Lundberg works in public relations.

He is president of Corporate Image Inc., a public-relations firm headquartered in East Tennessee and chief executive officer of Corporate Marketing, an advertising agency also headquartered in East Tennessee. In 2010, his company purchased Griffin Specialty Products and rebranded it to become Corporate Specialty Group, where he served as president. Corporate Specialty was sold in 2012. Prior to this, he was a broadcast journalist, being a lead anchor or managing editor for TV and radio stations in Colorado Springs, Vail, and Aspen, Colorado, in addition to Reno, Nevada, Wichita, Kansas, Bristol, Virginia, and Bristol, Tennessee.

On May 21, 2020, State Senator Rusty Crowe announced that Lundberg would be the co-chair of his campaign for election to the U.S. House of Representatives for the 1st District of Tennessee.

Electoral history

2006

2008

2010 
Jon Lundberg ran unopposed in the 2010 general election.

2012 
Jon Lundberg ran unopposed in the 2012 general election.

2014

2016 
Jon Lundberg launched his campaign to succeed Lt. Governor Ron Ramsey, who was vacating the district 4 seat; he defeated former state representative Tony Shipley and perennial candidate Neal Kerney. 

Jon Lundberg ran unopposed in the 2016 general election.

2020 
Jon Lundberg ran unopposed in the Republican primary election. In the general election, he defeated first-time candidate and Kingsport native Amber Riddle.

References

1961 births
Living people
People from Royal Oak, Michigan
American Presbyterians
Republican Party members of the Tennessee House of Representatives
Colorado State University Pueblo alumni
21st-century American politicians